Hailliote Sumney also known as Hallie Sumney is a Canadian-born Ghanaian actress, brand influencer, TV personality and philanthropist. She has interviewed celebs such as actor Boris Kodjoe, Michael Blackson, Becca, Stonebwoy and others.  She is the female brand ambassador for London-based shoe brand Jesu Segun alongside Stonebwoy, who is the male ambassador. In 2019 she was selected as the host for 4Syte TV's BET Awards red carpet.

Early life and education 
Sumney was born in Canada to Dr. Kodjoe Sumney and Dr. Akosuah Sumney but moved to the United States when she was two years old. She studied nursing at the Summit career college, California and also had her tertiary education at the University of California, Riverside in California.

Career 
She quit her career as a nurse at the Riverside Hospital in United States to pursue acting in Africa. She made her acting debut starring in a TV series, Heels and Sneakers which was produced by Yvonne Nelson. She has also featured in Lagos Fake Life, a movie produced by Mike Ezuruonye, starred as a character in Mike Ezu's "To kill a ghost" including already released TV series, Eden  and has also worked on projects featured on popular streaming networks including Netflix, Amazon Prime and IROKOtv. She also debuted on television at 4Syte TV as a presenter.

Works 

 She is known to have worked on a movie titled A Way Back Home, which features the likes of Alexx Ekubo, IK Ogbonna and others.

Filmography

References

Living people
Ghanaian mass media people
Ghanaian actresses
Canadian people of Ghanaian descent
Year of birth missing (living people)
University of California alumni